National Route 297 is a national highway of Japan connecting Tateyama, Chiba and Ichihara, Chiba in Japan, with a total length of 107 km (66.49 mi).

References

National highways in Japan
Roads in Chiba Prefecture